Kulak-e Bordabal (also Romanized as Kūlaḵ-e Bordabal) is a village in Mazu Rural District, Alvar-e Garmsiri District, Andimeshk County, Khuzestan Province, Iran. At the 2006 census, its population was 40, in 7 families.

References 

Populated places in Andimeshk County